The 2002–03 Interliga season was the fourth season of the multi-national ice hockey league. Nine teams participated in the league, and Alba Volan Szekesfehervar from Hungary have won the championship.

Regular season

Play-offs

Semi-finals

Final

Placing round

Vojvodina (8) – Zvolen 2 (5): 2–2 (2–0, 0–1, 0–1)
Zvolen 2 – Vojvodina Novi Sad: 4–2 (2–0, 1–1, 1–1)
Medveščak (7) – Slavija (6): 4–6 (3–4, 1–1, 0–1)
Slavija – Medveščak : 8–2 (0–1, 2–0, 6–1)
 
3rd place
Dunaújvárosi Acélbikák (4) – Olimpija (3): 6–3 (1–0, 3–0, 2–3)
Olimpija – Dunaújvárosi Acélbikák: 1–3 (0–1, 1–0, 0–2)

5th place
Slavija (5) – Zvolen 2 (6)
Zvolen 2 – Slavija

7th place
Vojvodina (8) – Medveščak (7): 2–1 (0–1, 2–0, 0–0)
Medveščak – Vojvodina: 3–1

External links
Season on www.hockeyarchives.info

Interliga (1999–2007) seasons
2002–03 in European ice hockey leagues
Inter